The Alarm Clock (Le Réveil-matin or Le Revéille-matin) is an oil on canvas painting by the Belgian surrealist René Magritte, completed in 1957.

References

Paintings by René Magritte
1957 paintings